The Belizean Grove is an elite, invitation-only American women's social club, located in New York City. Founded in 1999 by Susan Stautberg, a former Westinghouse Broadcasting executive, and Edie Weiner, a futurist, the Belizean Grove includes approximately 115 to 125 influential members from the military, financial, and diplomatic sectors. It is the female equivalent to the male-only social group, the Bohemian Club, whose annual meetings are held at the Bohemian Grove in California. The Belizean Grove meets annually in Belize or similar Central American locations. They also meet in New York and other U.S. cities, for activities they describe as "a balance of fun, substantive programs and bonding".

Notable members of the Belizean Grove include former General Services Administration Administrator Lurita Doan and U.S. Army General Ann E. Dunwoody. High-level executives from Goldman Sachs, Victoria's Secret, and Harley-Davidson also belong to the Grove, as do some ambassadors. Other business leaders include: Davia Temin, CEO and Founder of Temin and Company, Catherina Allen, CEO of Santa Fe Group, and Ann Kaplan of Circle Financial Group. Supreme Court justice Sonia Sotomayor was a member of the Grove until June 19, 2009, when she resigned after Republican senators voiced concerns over the group's women-only membership policy.

See also
 Gentlemen's club
 International Debutante Ball 
 Women's club

References

Organizations based in New York City
Organizations established in 1999
Women's clubs in the United States
Sculptures of women in New York City
1999 establishments in New York (state)
Women in New York City